Rossabø Church is a parish church of the Church of Norway in Haugesund Municipality in Rogaland county, Norway. It is located in the southern part of the town of Haugesund. It is the church for the Rossabø parish which is part of the Haugaland prosti (deanery) in the Diocese of Stavanger. The modern-style, concrete church was built in a fan-shaped style in 1972 using designs by the architects Per Amund Riseng and Jan Stensrud. The church seats about 360 people, but can be expanded up to 600 people.

See also
List of churches in Rogaland

References

Haugesund
Churches in Rogaland
20th-century Church of Norway church buildings
Churches completed in 1972
1972 establishments in Norway